Amal el-Wahabi is a British woman convicted of funding terrorism, for asking a friend to smuggle funds to Turkey, for her husband, Aine Lesley Davis in her clothing.

Personal life
El-Wahabi was born in the United Kingdom to parents who were immigrants from Morocco. She attended Holland Park Comprehensive.

El-Wahabi and Davis met at her mosque's daycare, when they were 19 years old.  The pair had two children together.  Prior to his July 2013 departure for occupied Syria, Davis had been a drug dealer, and been convicted possession of weapons charges.

Terrorism
El-Wahabi was convicted of funding terrorism, for trying to send 20,000 euros to her husband, described in court as a fighter for ISIL.

After his departure el-Wahabi had asked a friend, from Holland Park Comprehensive, to smuggle the funds to Turkey, in her underwear.  The Mirror, and other newspapers reporting on the trial, described the friend as having been duped into smuggling funds, without realizing the funds were intended to support terrorism. The friend was acquitted, El-Wahabi, on the other hand, was believed to know that funds sent to Davis would be supporting terrorism, and was convicted.

In November 2014, el-Wahabi received a 28-month sentence, half of which she would have to serve in custody.

References

Year of birth missing (living people)
Living people
British people of Moroccan descent
British prisoners and detainees
People educated at Holland Park School
People imprisoned on charges of terrorism
Prisoners and detainees of England and Wales